Rumigny is a commune in the Somme department in Hauts-de-France in northern France.

Geography

The manor house, Chateau de Rumigny, is set in woodland to the west of the village centre.

Population

See also
Communes of the Somme department

References

External links

 Official commune website 

Communes of Somme (department)